Hundreds of thousands of Swiss women went on strike to protest gender inequalities on 14 June 2019. The women's strike, known as Frauenstreik (German) and Grève des Femmes (French) online, consisted of demonstrations in the country's major municipalities for equal pay, recognition of unpaid care work, and governmental representation.

The date of the 2019 Swiss women's strike was set to match the 1991 Swiss women's strike, which was organised 10 years after the acceptance by the Swiss population of the constitutional article on the equality between women and men on June 14th, 1981.

References

Further reading

External links 

2019 in Switzerland
2019 in women's history
June 2019 events in Switzerland
General strikes in Europe
Protests in Switzerland
Feminist protests
Women's rights in Switzerland
Switzerland